Ross Wilson may refer to:

Sports
 Ross Wilson (Nordic skier) (1909-1997), Canadian Olympic skier
 Ross Wilson (ice hockey) (1919–2002), Canadian hockey player
 Ross Wilson (sprinter) (born 1950), Australian sprinter in Athletics at the 1970 British Commonwealth Games
 Ross Wilson (long-distance runner) (born 1969), New Zealander in 1988 IAAF World Cross Country Championships – Junior men's race
 Ross Wilson (table tennis) (born 1995), British Paralympic table tennis player
 Ross Wilson (cyclist), Canadian para-cyclist

Others
 Ross Wilson (musician) (born 1947), Australian musician, songwriter, and singer
 Ross Wilson (ambassador) (born 1955), U.S. diplomat and ambassador
 Ross Wilson (artist) (born 1958), Irish artist and sculptor